The 41st New Brunswick Legislative Assembly represented New Brunswick between March 5, 1949, and July 16, 1952. The Legislature of 52 members was elected in 1948.

David Laurence MacLaren served as Lieutenant-Governor of New Brunswick.

Harry O. Downey was chosen as speaker.

The Liberal Party led by John B. McNair formed the government.

History

Members 

Notes:

References 
 Canadian Parliamentary Guide, 1952, PG Normandin

Terms of the New Brunswick Legislature
1948 establishments in New Brunswick
1952 disestablishments in New Brunswick
20th century in New Brunswick